Lamuel A. Stanislaus CBE (April 22, 1921 – September 18, 2016) was a Grenadian dentist and diplomat.
Lamuel Stanislaus left Grenada in the mid 1940s to attend dental school at Howard University. After 1956 he lived in Brooklyn where he founded Caribbeans for Ed Koch.

Stanislaus died on September 18th 2016 at the age of 95 in Brooklyn, New York, U.S.

References

1921 births
2016 deaths
Permanent Representatives of Grenada to the United Nations
Howard University alumni
People from Brooklyn
Grenadian expatriates in the United States